Eubrachylaelaps is a genus of mites in the family Laelapidae.

Species
 Eubrachylaelaps hollisteri (Ewing, 1925)

References

Laelapidae